Terrell County may refer to:

Places
 Terrell County, Georgia
 Terrell County, Texas
 Terrell County Independent School District, a public school district based in Sanderson, Texas

Ships
 USS Terrell County (LST-1157), a United States Navy tank landing ship in commission from 1952 to 1971